Carla Baratta Sarcinelli (born 9 July 1990) is a Venezuelan actress, model, and artist. She is most well known for being the star of the digital series Bleep, broadcast by the mobile phone company Digitel GSM. Since she was young, she has studied stage acting in places such as Estudio 7 Alfredo Aparicio in San Cristobal-Venezuela, the New York Film Academy and the New Collective in Los Angeles, as well as the Actors Gym in Caracas.

In 2017, The Hollywood Reporter reported that she had been cast in the Sons of Anarchy spinoff, Mayans MC, as Adelita.

Career

Theater

Film

Television and web series

Music Videos

References

1990 births
Living people
Venezuelan film actresses
Venezuelan television actresses
Venezuelan stage actresses
People from San Cristóbal, Táchira
Venezuelan expatriates in the United States